The 2009 GDF Suez Grand Prix was a women's tennis tournament played on outdoor clay courts. It was the 15th edition of the Budapest Grand Prix, an International-level tournament on the 2009 WTA Tour. It took place in Budapest, Hungary, from 4 July until 12 July 2009. Ágnes Szávay won the singles title.

Entrants

Seeds

* Seedings are based on the rankings of June 22, 2009.

Other entrants
The following players received wildcards into the singles main draw:
  Patty Schnyder
  Katalin Marosi
  Gréta Arn

The following players received entry from the qualifying draw:
  Timea Bacsinszky
  Margalita Chakhnashvili
  Sharon Fichman
  Petra Martić
The following players received the lucky loser spots:
 Lenka Juríková 
 Irina-Camelia Begu

Finals

Singles

 Ágnes Szávay defeated  Patty Schnyder, 2–6, 6–4, 6–2
It was Szávay's first title of the year and 3rd of her career.

Doubles

 Alisa Kleybanova /  Monica Niculescu defeated  Alona Bondarenko /  Kateryna Bondarenko, 6–4, 7–6(7–5)

References

External links
Official website
Singles, Doubles and Qualifying Singles draws

GDF Suez Grand Prix
Budapest Grand Prix
Buda
Buda